Glenn Eichler (born ) is an American comedy writer. He started out as an editor for National Lampoon magazine. He then worked as story editor for the MTV television shows Beavis and Butt-head and The Maxx. He was later responsible for co-creating and producing the television show Daria, a spinoff from Beavis and Butt-Head, for MTV as well as Hey Joel for VH1. He has also written for such shows as Rugrats, Bratz, Married... with Children, and The Wrong Coast, a stop-action animation mini-series for the American Movie Classics cable channel. He currently writes for The Late Show with Stephen Colbert on CBS after also writing for Stephen Colbert in Comedy Central's The Colbert Report.

Eichler is the author of the humor books Mush!: Sled Dogs with Issues, Stuffed!, Bill and Hillary's Twelve-Step Guide to Recovery (a political satire), and Dr. Katz's Me At a Glance.

Because he was executive producer of Daria, he is sometimes claimed to be the creator of the character Daria Morgendorffer; this was actually the work of Beavis and Butt-head writer David Felton, with some input from Mike Judge.

Personal life
Born in The Bronx and raised in New Rochelle, New York, Eichler produced a four-page joke newspaper as a pre-teen called the Wykagyl Wombat. He graduated from American University, where he majored in American literature and worked as a writer for a trade publication before finding work at the National Lampoon. Since 2000, he and his family have been residents of Montclair, New Jersey.

References

External links

American television writers
American University alumni
American male television writers
Living people
People from Montclair, New Jersey
People from New Rochelle, New York
People from the Bronx
Year of birth missing (living people)
Writers Guild of America Award winners